Ram Kumar Gautam is an Indian politician.

He was elected for second time to the Haryana Legislative Assembly from Narnaund in the 2019 Haryana Legislative Assembly election as a member of the Jannayak Janta Party.

He is BA, LLB.

His wife is retired as Associate Professor- Political Science. His son Rajat Gautam is an advocate of Punjab and Haryana High Court and had been chairman of Bar Council of Punjab and Haryana High Court. His daughter Kirti Bhardwaj is settled in Canada.

He lives in Gautam colony.

He became a Member of Legislative Assembly 2019, elected against Captain Abhimanyu (Khanda).

References

Living people
Jannayak Janta Party politicians
People from Hisar district
Haryana MLAs 2019–2024
Year of birth missing (living people)